Megachile sphenapis is a species of bee in the family Megachilidae. It was described by Yan-Ru Wu in 2005.

References

Sphenapis
Insects described in 2005